Naqab is a 1955 Indian Hindustani-language fantasy film directed by Lekhraj Bhakhri. 
It stars Shammi Kapoor, Madhubala, Ajit and the film revolves around a damsel in distress who receives help from her fiance and his sister.

Plot 
The Wazir of the State was madly in love with Princess Rukhshana who was engaged with Prince
Kamran of the neighbouring State. She disliked the Wazir. To fulfill his desire Wazir one night killed
her father, the King. Even then Princess refused to fulfill his desire and she was imprisoned in the
Palace on the Lake.Prince Kamran knowing this fact, comes to the city in disguise with his sister Yasmin and few of his
soldiers to make the princess free. The Wazir knowing the Kamran's arrival orders that nobody should
move out in the city after sun-set.Yasmin is taken by the police who was moving the streets after sunset to the Police station as prisoner.
Anwar in charge of the Police station falls in love with Yasmin, releases her. She cleverly knows the
place where Princess is kept. She keeps Anwar in dark about her place and name. She names her as
Roohi.Roohi informs Kamran the place where Princess is kept and he suggests to keep Anwar in hands for
their purpose. It so happens that Anwar is deputed as Guard in charge at the Palace and gets special
medal from Wazir. With the help of Anwar Roohi and Kamran manages to see the Princess, present her
flowers and these flowers becomes the cause for Wazir to know that somebody was with Anwar to see
the Princess. Wazir orders Anwar to be handcuffed and bring him in Durbar. Here Roohi cleverly
releases him pleasing "Wazir by her Dances".Once again Kamran taking the help of the Medal goes to the palace where Wazir is also present. They
come in direct fight and after wards he runs away. Roohi takes back the medal to Anwar, saying that
one man named Kamran had the medal and he is coming back to her place in the night.Wazir informed by Anwar of the fact comes to Roohi's place where Roohi manages to take seal on Wazir Handkerchief by her skill.Kamran taking his Handkerchief runs to the palace to set free Princess and succeeds.But unluckily Princess is trapped again.Now comes the most interesting part of the story. Anwar gets orders to bring Kamran and Roohi live or
dead. Roohi is imprisoned. Kamran escapes and make the Princess free. In the open vide Public Arena Wazir orders Anwar to shoot Roohi, his sweetheart. What happens next, whether Anwar shoots her?

Cast 
The main cast of the film was:
Shammi Kapoor as Anwar
Madhubala as Yasmin
Ajit as Kamran
Asha Mathur as Rukhsana
Yashodhara Katju as Rani
Maruti as Yasmin's servant

Music

Reception and box office 
Naqab got mixed-to-negative reviews from critics. Cineplot wrote about the film: "Production values of Naqab, in the matter of its sets, decor and costumes, are excellent. The photography and sound-recording, however, are of patchy quality. While the music is passable, the songs, though well scored, are poorly sung and the playback for Madhubala is unpleasantly shrill." It proclaimed that Yashodhara Katju is the only one to give a good performance in the film, and everyone else "fails".

The film stood at number 27 in the list of highest-grossing Indian films of 1955, with a flop status.

References

External links 
 

1955 films
Indian fantasy films
1950s fantasy films
Indian black-and-white films